This is a list of hospitals in Edo State in Nigeria grouped by nature of ownership and sorted by  hospital name.

Federal
Federal Neuro-Psychiatric, Benin City
 Irrua Specialist Teaching Hospital
 University of Benin Teaching Hospital
 Stella Obasanjo Women and Children Hospital, Benin

State
Edo Specialist Hospital, Benin City
Central Hospital Benin, Benin City
Uromi  General Hospital, Uromi
General Hospital, Auchi

Private
Igbinedion University Teaching Hospital, Okada
Lily Hospital, Benin City

References

Edo
Edo State